The chapters of the Japanese manga series Hozuki's Coolheadedness are written and illustrated by Natsumi Eguchi. They were serialized in Kodansha's magazine Weekly Morning between March 3, 2011, and January 9, 2020. Its 271 chapters have been collected into thirty-one tankōbon published between May 23, 2011, and September 23, 2020. An English-language digital edition is released by Kodansha Comics through its digital content distributor Kodansha Advanced Media. The first volume was released on March 21, 2017, while the tenth was made available on September 20, 2022.

A yonkoma (four-panel) spin-off by Monaka Shiba was published in Kodansha's Nakayoshi between December 1, 2015, and April 3, 2020; subtitled , it focuses on Shiro. Its first tankōbon volume was released on November 22, 2016, while the fifth and last was released on September 23, 2020.

Volume list

Hozuki's Coolheadedness

Hozuki no Reitetsu: Shiro no Ashiato

References

Hozuki's Coolheadedness